Anke Helfrich (born 11 November 1966) is a German jazz pianist and composer.

Life and work
Helfrich grew up in Windhoek, Namibia and Weinheim, Germany where she received piano lessons. After a national success at Jugend jazzt in 1987 she studied in Freiburg and in 1989 attended the Amsterdamse Hoogeschool for the Arts. During this time she undertook a scholarship in New York with Kenny Barron and Larry Goldings.

In 1996 Helfrich formed a trio with John Weidenmüller and Jochen Rückert, releasing their first album You'll See in 2000 with guest Mark Turner. From 2002, she toured as a trio with Martin Gjakonovski and Dejan Terzic (jazz drummer).

From 1999 to 2004 Helfrich played in a quartet with Jürgen Seefelder.

Since 1999 she has lectured at the University of Music and Performing Arts in Mannheim, and since 2011 at Dr Hochs Conservatory in Frankfurt.

In 2006 her CD Better Times Ahead was nominated for the German Record Critics' Quarterly Prize. In 2016 she received the ECHO Jazz in the category "National Instrumentalist of the Year - Piano/Keyboards". In 2017 she was awarded the Hessian Jazz Prize.

Discography
 Christian Eckert Quartet - Musing (1995)
 Jens Bunge - With All My Heart (1996)
 Anke Helfrich Trio ft. Mark Turner - You'll See (2000)
 Witchcraft ft. Stacy Rowles and Carolyn Breuer - Witchcraft Live (2004)
 Barbara Bridesmaid - Berlin Spirits (2004)
 Anke Helfrich Trio ft. Roy Hargrove - Better Times Ahead (2006)
 Anke Helfrich Trio ft. Nils Wogram - Stormproof (2009)
 Anke Helfrich Trio ft. Tim Hagens - Dedication (2015)

References

External links
 Webpräsenz Helfrichs
 Porträt, 
 Interview
 Jazzpreis Worms; jazzpages.com
 Jazzzeitung über Helfrich

German jazz pianists
1966 births
German jazz composers
People from Windhoek
Living people
Women jazz pianists
Women jazz composers
21st-century pianists
21st-century women pianists